Kohl Plateau is an ice-covered plateau, over  high, standing between the heads of Keilhau Glacier and Neumayer Glacier in the central part of South Georgia. It was discovered and first indicated on a map by Ludwig Kohl-Larsen during his 1929–30 expedition; the plateau was surveyed and named for its discoverer by the South Georgia Survey, 1951–52.

References

Landforms of South Georgia